SBK may refer to:
SBK Records, former record label
ShoreBank insolvent US community development bank acquired by the Urban Partnership Bank
Silver Bells Killer
Superbike World Championship
SBK: Snowboard Kids, video game
South Brooklyn Railway, reporting mark
Triclopyr herbicide, SBK Brushwood Killer in UK
Sungai Buloh-Kajang Line, metro line
 South Bronx Killas, a fictional gang